K26 or K-26 may refer to:

 K-26 (Kansas highway)
 , a submarine of the Royal Navy
 Sonata in E-flat, K. 26, by Wolfgang Amadeus Mozart